The Pompejanum (or Pompeiianum) is an idealised replica of a Roman villa, located on the high banks of the river Main in Aschaffenburg, Bavaria, Germany. It was commissioned by King Ludwig I and built in the 1840s. The villa is a replica of a domus (or town house) in ancient Pompeii, the so-called House of Castor and Pollux (Casa dei Dioscuri), so named after a wall drawing, which was found in the entrance area of the ruined building. The original house in Pompeii was destroyed in 79 AD by the eruption of Mount Vesuvius.

Location
The Pompejanum is situated on the high bank of the river Main in the city of Aschaffenburg, in the Lower Franconia region of Bavaria. It is located within sight of Schloss Johannisburg. The Pompejanum is surrounded by a small mediterranean garden, first created in the 19th century when the building was constructed.

History

The Pompejanum was commissioned by King Ludwig I and built in the years 1840-1848 according to the plans of the court architect Friedrich von Gärtner. The Pompejanum was not intended as a royal villa, but as a demonstration that would allow art lovers in Germany to study ancient culture. The building is a symbol for the enthusiasm for antiquity in the 19th century.  

During World War II the Pompejanum was heavily damaged and restored in phases beginning in 1960. A Roman bust found in Texas in 2018, believed to be of Sextus Pompeius, will be returned to the museum in 2023.

Today
Since 1994, the Pompejanum houses original Roman art works from the collections of the Staatliche Antikensammlungen and the Glyptothek in Munich. The building also hosts temporary exhibitions.

References

Further reading
 Das Pompejanum in Aschaffenburg: Amtlicher Führer von Werner Helmberger und Raimund Wünsche (German), 
 Simon, E.: Das Pompejanum in Aschaffenburg und seine Vorbilder in Pompeji (German). Aschaffenburger Jahrbuch 6, 1979, pp. 423-428

External links

Buildings and structures in Aschaffenburg
Museums in Bavaria
Registered historic buildings and monuments in Bavaria
Landmarks in Germany
Monuments and memorials in Germany
Replica buildings